Tailgate is the debut studio album by American country music group Trailer Choir. It was released on July 6, 2010 via Show Dog-Universal Music. The album includes the single "Shakin' That Tailgate," as well as the songs "Rockin' the Beer Gut" and "Rollin' Through the Sunshine," previously released as singles from the trio's 2009 EP Off the Hillbilly Hook. The tracks "Off the Hillbilly Hook," "In My Next 5 Beers" and "Last Man Standing" were previously included on that EP as well.

"Wal-Mart Flowers" was previously released by Stephen Cochran in 2009.

Track listing

Personnel
Trailer Choir
 Marc "Butter" Fortney - vocals
 Vencent "Big Vinny" Hickerson - vocals
 Crystal Hoyt - vocals

Additional Musicians
 Tim Akers - keyboards
 Eric Darken - percussion
 Fred Eltringham - drums
 Paul Franklin - pedal steel guitar
 Kenny Greenberg - electric guitar
 Rob Hajacos - fiddle
 Weston Harvey - background vocals
 Mark Hill - bass guitar
 Rob McNelly - electric guitar
 Jerry McPherson - electric guitar
 Greg Morrow - drums
 Michael Rhodes - bass guitar
 Mike Rojas - keyboards
 David Santos - bass guitar
 Adam Shoenfeld - electric guitar
 Brandon Tant - background vocals
 Ilya Toshinsky - acoustic guitar

Critical reception
Thom Jurek of AllMusic rated the album three stars out of five, calling it "one solidly placed party anthem after another" but "strictly for contemporary country audiences." Country Weekly reviewer Jessica Phillips praised Butter and Crystal's vocals, but thought that the album lacked more serious songs to contrast the "unexceptional summer ditties." Her review gave it two-and-a-half stars out of five.

Chart performance

References

2010 debut albums
Trailer Choir albums
Show Dog-Universal Music albums
Albums produced by Mark Wright (record producer)